Sagana rutilans is a species of spiders in the family Liocranidae. It was first described in 1875 by Thorell. , it was the only species in the genus Sagana. It is found from Europe to Georgia. The genus name Sagana Thorell, 1875 is a junior homonym of the moth genus Sagana Walker, 1855 (now treated as a synonym of Copaxa), so the combination Sagana rutilans is unavailable, but  was still used in the World Spider Catalog.

References

Liocranidae
Spiders of Europe
Spiders of Georgia (country)
Spiders described in 1875